Indonesia competed at the 2020 Summer Paralympics in Tokyo, Japan. Originally scheduled to take place in 2020, the Games were rescheduled for 24 August to 5 September 2021, due to the COVID-19 pandemic.

The National Paralympic Committee of Indonesia confirmed a team of 23 athletes; the second largest delegation after 1980. It consisted of 14 men and 9 women, they will competing in seven sports. In this editions, Indonesia made its Paralympic debut in para-badminton (as new sport) and para-cycling. Also, it was return to shooting para sport after 33 years, including female para-shooter Hanik Puji Astuti, who became the nation's de facto flag bearer at the opening ceremony.

The Indonesian roster featured five returning paralympians: one-time paralympian Jendi Pangabean and Syuci Indriani in swimming, two-time paralympian Setyo Budi Hartanto in men's long jump T47 athletics, David Jacobs in the men's singles C-10 table tennis, and Ni Nengah Widiasih in the women's 41 kg powerlifting; the last two of whom were won bronze at the 2012 and 2016 Games, respectively.

Indonesia left Tokyo with nine medals; two gold, three silver and four bronze, improving its total medal tally and significantly rank from previous Games. It was the first Indonesians won all kind medals since the last time at year was the country's debut, as well as the best ever in the Paralympics. Leani Ratri Oktila, with her partners Khalimatus Sadiyah and Hary Susanto, became the Paralympic champions with two gold medals, each in women's doubles SL3-SU5 and mixed doubles SL3-SU5; the first time in 41 years. She was also won silver in women's singles SL4, make her as Indonesia's most successful paralympian.

Medalists

| width="78%" align="left" valign="top"|  

| width="22%" align="left" valign="top"|

Competitors

Athletics 

Indonesian athlete successfully to break through the qualifications for the 2020 Paralympics after breaking the qualification limit.

Badminton 

Men

Women

Mixed

Cycling 

Track
Men's

Powerlifting

Women's

Shooting

Indonesia entered two athletes into the Paralympic competition. Hanik Puji Astuti & Bolo Triyanto successfully break the Paralympic qualification at the 2019 WSPS World Championships which was held in Sydney, Australia.

Swimming 

Jendi Pangabean has successfully entered the paralympic slot after breaking the MQS.

Men

Women

Table tennis

Indonesia entered three athletes into the table tennis competition at the games. Two athletes compete in men's individual class 10, Komet Akbar qualified by winning the gold medal at the 2019 ITTF Asian Para Championships in Taichung, Taiwan and David Jacobs qualified after placing first at World Ranking, while other athletes, Adyos Astan qualified by received the bipartite commission invitation allocation quotas.

Men

Men's team

See also
 2020 Paralympic Games
 2020 Olympic Games
 Indonesia at the Paralympics
 Indonesia at the Olympics
 Indonesia at the 2020 Summer Olympics

Notes

References 

Nations at the 2020 Summer Paralympics
2020
2021 in Indonesian sport